Blued may refer to:
 Bluing (steel), a type of finish
 blued (macOS)
 Blued (app)